Diego de Osorio y Villegas (1540 in Villasandino – 1601 in Santo Domingo) was a sixteenth-century governor of Venezuela Province (1589–1597), the Venezuela Province being a part of the Spanish Empire. He was governor at the time of the Preston Somers Expedition  during which an English force found Caracas by way of a secret route through the mountains. 

He was then Governor of Santo Domingo until his death in 1601. Previously he spent 15 years fighting in the Dutch Revolt.

References

1540 births
Royal Governors of Venezuela
1601 deaths
Spanish people of the Eighty Years' War
16th-century Dominican Republic people
17th-century Dominican Republic people